Friedrich von Huene, born Friedrich Richard von Hoinigen, (March 22, 1875 – April 4, 1969) was a German paleontologist who renamed more dinosaurs in the early 20th century than anyone else in Europe. He also made key contributions about various Permo-Carboniferous limbed vertebrates.

Biography

Huene was born in Tübingen, Kingdom of Württemberg. His discoveries include the skeletons of more than 35 individuals of Plateosaurus in the famous Trossingen quarry, the early proto-dinosaur Saltopus in 1910, Proceratosaurus in 1926, the giant Antarctosaurus in 1929, and numerous other dinosaurs and fossilized animals like pterosaurs. He also was the first to naming several higher taxa, including Prosauropoda and Sauropodomorpha. In 1941 he found a stone that had petrified wood in it, sadly, He thought that it was a dinosaur. However a couple Polish paleontologists. The “dinosaur” was called the Succinodon

He visited the Geopark of Paleorrota in 1928, and there collected the Prestosuchus chiniquensis in 1938.

He also studied several Permo-Carboniferous and Triassic limbed vertebrates, including members of several large clades, such as Temnospondyli, Synapsida, and Sauropsida. In his work on mesosaurs, Huene indicated that a lower temporal fenestra was present (as in synapsids), an interpretation later rejected by many subsequent workers, but more recently upheld.

A new species of basal sauropodomorph, Lufengosaurus huenei, was named after von Huene in 1941.  Liassaurus huenei, an early carnivorous theropod, was named for him in 1995, though this name is invalid.

See also
 :Category:Taxa named by Friedrich von Huene

References

 Westphal, Frank (1972) "Huene, Friedrich von" In Neue Deutsche Biographie (volume 9 Heß–Hüttig), Duncker & Humblot, Berlin, pages 740–741
  length: 60 pages; Guide to the fossil finds in Rio Grande do Sul, and especially in the Santa Maria area.
  length: 582 pages

German paleontologists
1875 births
1969 deaths
People from Tübingen
People from the Kingdom of Württemberg
University of Tübingen alumni
Academic staff of the University of Tübingen